Lankascincus taylori, commonly known as Taylor's tree skink, is a species of lizard in the family Scincidae. The species is endemic to the island of Sri Lanka.

Etymology
The specific name, taylori, is in honor of American herpetologist Edward Harrison Taylor.

Habitat and Geographic range

Description
The head, body, and tail of L. taylori are long and slender. The midbody scales are in 24-26 rows. The lamellae under the fourth toe number 12-18. The dorsum is chocolate brown. Each dorsal scale has a dark gray horseshoe mark, which is open-ended posteriorly. A dark brown flank band can be seen with blue spots. The throat is grayish with blue spots. The venter is yellow.

Diet
The diet of L. taylori includes insects.

Reproduction
Sexually mature females of L. taylori usually lay 2 eggs at a time.

References

External links
Lankascincus taylori at The Reptile Database. http://reptile-database.reptarium.cz/species?genus=Lankascincus&species=taylori
Lankascincus taylori at Animal Diversity Web. http://animaldiversity.ummz.umich.edu/accounts/Lankascincus_taylori/classification/
Photos of Taylor's Lanka Skink
 Books about Lanka Skinks

Further reading
Austin CC, Das I, de Silva A (2004). "Higher-level molecular phylogenetic relationships of the endemic genus Lankascincus from Sri Lanka based on nuclear DNA sequences". Lyriocephalus 5 (1-2): 11-22.
Greer AE (1991). "Lankascincus, a New Genus of Scincid Lizards from Sri Lanka, with Descriptions of Three New Species". Journal of Herpetology 25 (1): 59-64. (Lankascincus taylori, new species).
Somaweera R, Somaweera N (2009). Lizards of Sri Lank, A Colour Guide with Field Keys. Frankfurt am Main, Germany: Edition Chimaira / Serpents Tale. 304 pp. .

Reptiles of Sri Lanka
Lankascincus
Reptiles described in 1991
Taxa named by Allen Eddy Greer